The following highways are numbered 302:

Canada
Manitoba Provincial Road 302
 Nova Scotia Route 302
Prince Edward Island Route 302
Saskatchewan Highway 302

China
 China National Highway 302

India
 National Highway 302 (India)

Japan
 Japan National Route 302

Philippines
 N302 highway (Philippines)

Thailand
  Thailand Route 302

United States
  U.S. Route 302
  Connecticut Route 302
  Georgia State Route 302
  Georgia State Route 302 Spur
  Kentucky Route 302
  Louisiana Highway 302
  Maryland Route 302
  Minnesota State Highway 302 (former)
  Mississippi Highway 302
  Montana Secondary Highway 302
  New York State Route 302
  North Carolina Highway 302 (former)
  Ohio State Route 302
  Pennsylvania Route 302 (former)
  South Carolina Highway 302
  Tennessee State Route 302
 Texas:
  Texas State Highway 302
  Texas State Highway Spur 302
  Farm to Market Road 302
  Utah State Route 302
  Virginia State Route 302
 Virginia State Route 302 (former)
  Washington State Route 302
  Washington State Route 302 Spur

Other areas:
  Puerto Rico Highway 302
  U.S. Virgin Islands Highway 302